Orlová is a town in Karviná District in the Moravian-Silesian Region of the Czech Republic. It has about 28,000 inhabitants.

Administrative parts

Orlová is made up of four town parts: Lazy, Lutyně, Město and Poruba.

Etymology
The name is most probably possessive in origin, derived from the personal Slavic name Orel / Orzeł (literally "eagle" in English), although it may also be of topographic origins.

Geography
It lies in the Ostrava Basin. The town is situated at the confluence of the streams Rychvaldská Stružka and Petřvaldská Stružka. There are several ponds in the territory.

History

12th–18th centuries

According to legend, Duke Mieszko IV Tanglefoot went hunting with his pregnant wife Ludmila. As they rested upon a hill, an eagle suddenly took flight, frightening the couple. The eagle dropped his prey, which fell to earth near them. Ludmila prematurely gave birth to her child, Casimir I of Opole. The couple, seeing a sign from God in this incident, founded a chapel on that spot and later named the subsequent settlement after the eagle.

The first written mention of Orlová is from 1223, when a settlement in this locality was mentioned in a deed of bishop Wawrzyniec. The name of Orlova was first used in a document of Pope Gregory IX issued on 7 December 1227 for Benedictine abbey in Tyniec. Between 1268 and 1291, a separate but dependent from Tyniec Benedictine monastery was founded.

Politically it belonged then to the Duchy of Opole and Racibórz and the Castellany of Cieszyn, which was in 1290 formed in the process of feudal fragmentation of Poland into the Duchy of Teschen, ruled by a local branch of Silesian Piast dynasty. In 1327 the duchy became a fee of the Kingdom of Bohemia, which after 1526 became a part of the Habsburg monarchy.

For centuries, the settlement had mostly agricultural character, although there were also crafts, especially linen. After the secularization of the monastery property in 1560, Orlová was acquired by the Cikán of Slupek family, who held it until 1619. From 1619 to 1838 it was owned by the Bludovský of Bludov family, who had built here a castle in 1765.

19th–20th centuries
The first attempts of coal mining took place in 1817. In 1838 Orlová was acquired by the House of Mattencloit. In 1844, they allowed coal mining in the region, which led to a fundamental change in the character of Orlová. The population grew rapidly and typical mining colonies were established in the vicinity of the mines. Another important event was the completion of the Košice–Bohumín Railway in 1868. Industrial development has also brought a social and cultural boom. In the early 20th century, Orlová became an important centre of Polish and Czech education and home to many cultural and sport organizations of both communities.

After the Revolutions of 1848 in the Austrian Empire, a modern municipal division was introduced in the re-established Austrian Silesia. The municipality was subscribed at least since 1880 to political district and legal district of Freistadt. In 1908 the municipality was promoted to a market town and in 1922 to a town.

According to the censuses conducted in 1880–1910, the dominant language spoken colloquially was alternating. In 1880 and 1900 the majority were Polish-speakers (2,287 or 79.8% in 1880 and 3.919 or 60.3% in 1900), whereas in 1890 and 1910 the majority were Czech-speakers (2.199 or 65.8% in 1890 and 4.799 or 58.5% in 1910). They were accompanied by a German-speaking minority (at least 4.7% in 1890, at most 7.3% in 1910). In terms of religion, in 1910 the majority were Roman Catholics (6,140 or 73.6%), followed by Protestants (1,801 or 21.6%), Jews (374 or 4.5%) and others (19 or 0.3%).

After World War I, Polish–Czechoslovak War and the division of Cieszyn Silesia in 1920, Orlová became a part of Czechoslovakia. Following the Munich Agreement, in October 1938 together with the Zaolzie region it was annexed by Poland, administratively organised in Frysztat County of Silesian Voivodeship. The village was then annexed by Nazi Germany at the beginning of World War II. After the war it was restored to Czechoslovakia.

In 1950 the municipalities of Lazy and Poruba were administratively joined to Orlová. In 1961, Lutyně (that time named Horní Lutyně) was joined. From 1974 to 1990, Doubrava was also part of the town.

Widespread coal mining, especially during the communist era, had a devastating impact on the town, its buildings and architecture, especially in Lazy. The complete liquidation of Orlová and the relocation of its citizens to the surrounding municipalities were even considered. After the annexation of Horní Lutyně, this plan was changed into the idea of building a large housing estate in this village, which would offer a new home to people from undermined parts of the town and new citizens. Construction of the housing estate began in 1963. After the Velvet Revolution in 1989, there was a shift away from the town's one-sided focus on coal mining, and revitalization efforts began.

Demography

Economy

In the Quality of Life Index, which has been comparing the standard of living in the cities and towns of the Czech Republic since 2018, Orlová has always finished in last place out of 206 evaluated. The town is facing high unemployment and lack of job opportunities, air pollution, insufficient infrastructure, demographic issues and other problems.

Education
There are seven primary schools in Orlová, including one in the Polish language. Five entities provide secondary education in the town and one entity provides a higher vocational education.

Sport
Orlová organises annually a women's cycle stage race Gracia–Orlová and hosts the final stage of the race.

The town's football club FK Slavia Orlová plays in the lower amateur tiers of the Czech football system.

Sights

The most important landmark in Orlová is the neo-Gothic Church of the Nativity of the Virgin Mary, built in 1903–1906. Its neo-Gothic appearance is the cleanest in the Czech Republic. This church replaced an older church from 1466, which was built on a pilgrimage site documented in the 13th century. It has a presbytery from the previous church. The church complex includes a valuable set of statues with a staircase, and is surrounded by the adjacent castle park. The building is undermined and has been threatened with extinction several times in its history.

The castle park is located on the site of a castle from 1765, which was damaged by coal mining and subsequently demolished in 1974. The park was established in the first half of the 19th century.

Another notable landmark is the town hall from 1928. It is a three-storey house with Neoclassical façade, protected as a cultural monument.

The Lutheran church is a Neoclassical building. It was consecrated in 1862.

Notable people
Emanuel Chobot (1881–1944), Polish politician
Karol Piegza (1899–1988), Polish writer, folklorist and artist
Józef Berger (1901–1962), Polish theologian and politician
Adolf Fierla (1908–1967), Polish poet
Gustaw Przeczek (1913–1974), Polish poet and writer
Stanislav Kolíbal (born 1925), artist and sculptor
Bohdan Warchal (1930–2000), Slovak violinist
Eugene K. Balon (1930–2013), Polish-Czech-Canadian zoologist and ichthyologist
Radim Uzel (1940–2022), sexologist; studied here
Martina Janková (born 1972), opera singer

Twin towns – sister cities

Orlová is twinned with:
 Crikvenica, Croatia
 Czechowice-Dziedzice, Poland
 Illnau-Effretikon, Switzerland
 Námestovo, Slovakia
 Rydułtowy, Poland

References

External links

  

Cities and towns in the Czech Republic
Populated places in Karviná District
Cieszyn Silesia
Socialist planned cities